Oligia minuscula, known generally as the small brocade or bog oligia, is a species of cutworm or dart moth in the family Noctuidae. It is found in North America.

The MONA or Hodges number for Oligia minuscula is 9416.

Subspecies
These two subspecies belong to the species Oligia minuscula:
 Oligia minuscula grahami Benjamin, 1933
 Oligia minuscula minuscula

References

Further reading

 
 
 

Oligia
Articles created by Qbugbot
Moths described in 1875